The Farmers' Association (ŪS) was a political party in inter-war Lithuania. Its leaders included Aleksandras Stulginskis, Vytautas Petrulis and Kazys Jokantas. A political party, established in 1989 under the same name, claims historical heritage of the ŪS.

History
The party was established as the Lithuanian Peasant League in 1905, and was linked to the Ūkininkas newspaper. In 1920 it became the "Farmers' Association", and began to associate closely with the Lithuanian Christian Democratic Party.

The ŪS won 20 seats in the 1920 election, and became part of the Christian Democratic Bloc alongside the Christian Democratic Party and the Labour Federation. Together, the Bloc held a majority in the First Seimas, and formed a government with the Peasant Union. The ŪS won 12 seats in the 1922 elections, with the Bloc just short of a majority. After governing with the support of independents, early elections were held in 1923 which saw the ŪS win 14 seats and the Bloc gain a parliamentary majority, allowing it to govern alone.

The 1926 elections saw a loss of support for the ŪS, as it was reduced to 11 seats. With the Labour Federation losing more than half its seats, the Christian Democratic Bloc lost its majority and control of the government.

Following the 1926 coup, the ŪS joined the opposition to the Antanas Smetona government, and was subsequently suspended by decree in 1928.

References

Defunct political parties in Lithuania
Political parties of minorities in Imperial Russia
Political parties established in 1905
Political parties disestablished in 1928
1905 establishments in the Russian Empire